Debby Haak (born 25 February 1977) is a former tennis player from the Netherlands. She turned professional at the age of 18.

She made her WTA Tour main-draw debut at the 2000 Heineken Trophy after she received a wild card into the doubles draw. In her career, she won 17 ITF doubles titles and achieved a highest doubles ranking of 154 in the world.

ITF finals

Singles (0–2)

Doubles (17–22)

Unplayed final

References

External links
 
 

1977 births
Living people
Dutch female tennis players
20th-century Dutch women
21st-century Dutch women